Gibbonstown is a townland in County Westmeath, Ireland. The townland is located in the civil parish of Kilbride. The R400 regional road runs to the west of the area. The townland of Fearmore lies to the south, Gaulstown and Whitewell to the west, and the town of Rochfortbridge to the south.

References 

Townlands of County Westmeath